Steel Rain is the second studio album by American Tejano music singer Jay Perez. The album peaked at number five on the US Billboard Regional Mexican Albums chart. It garnered Perez a nomination for the Tejano Music Award for Male Entertainer of the Year and Male Vocalist of the Year at the 1995 Tejano Music Awards. The title track was nominated for the Tejano Country Single of the Year. One of the songs on the album, "Corazon", is a cover version of Carole King's song with the same title taken from her album Fantasay (1973).

Track listing 
Credits adapted from the liner notes of Steel Rain.

Charts

See also 

 1994 in Latin music
 Latin American music in the United States

References

Works cited 

1994 albums
Sony Discos albums
Spanish-language albums
Jay Perez albums